Reuben Lautenschlager (September 7, 1915 – January 5, 1992) was an American professional basketball player. He played for the Sheboygan Red Skins in the National Basketball League from 1938 to 1947.

References

1915 births
1992 deaths
American men's basketball players
Basketball players from Wisconsin
Forwards (basketball)
Guards (basketball)
National Basketball Association referees
Sheboygan Red Skins players
Sportspeople from Oshkosh, Wisconsin
Wisconsin–Oshkosh Titans football players
Wisconsin–Oshkosh Titans men's basketball players